(also known as Left Fencer) is a 1969 Japanese samurai drama and action film, directed by Kimiyoshi Yasuda. Michiyo Okusu plays the role of the one-eyed, one-armed swords-woman O-kin. This film follows in the series of films about Tange Sazen, but this one features a female version of the Sazen—Lady Sazen.

Plot
Many years ago, ronin hired by Lord Daizen-dayu killed the parents of a young girl named O-kin, then crippled her by cutting off her right arm and gouging out her right eye. Nevertheless, O-kin grows up and becomes a great swords-woman. Despite her mutilated body, she becomes unbeatable. Now she lives in a small town and owns/wields a very valuable and rare sword - The Drenched Swallow.

A girl named O-mitsu has been led to believe that she will become a maid in a Lord's castle, but is instead taken to a temple where she is sexually degraded by the Head Priest. She escapes and is being pursued by hired Yakuza when O-kin appears and saves her. The Head Priest and the Lord (who is in cahoots with each other) are eager to silence O-mitsu, so they begin a massive manhunt for both her and O-kin, leading O-kin to cut her way to the heart of a massive conspiracy involving corrupt religious leaders and government officials, the Yakuza and the Lord who killed O-kin's parents and disfigured her body.

Cast
 Michiyo Okusu as Lady Sazen O-kin (credited as Michiyo Yasuda) 
 Kōjirō Hongō
 Takashi Kanda
 Asao Koike
 Kayo Mikimoto
 Isamu Nagato as Gamou Taiken
 Sōnosuke Sawamura

References

External links 
 
 

1969 films
1960s action drama films
Japanese action films
Samurai films
1960s Japanese-language films
Films about amputees
1969 drama films
1960s Japanese films